Jānis Skrastiņš (born 7 July 1955) is a Latvian bobsledder. He competed in the four man event at the 1984 Winter Olympics, representing the Soviet Union.

References

1955 births
Living people
Latvian male bobsledders
Olympic bobsledders of the Soviet Union
Bobsledders at the 1984 Winter Olympics